Hush may refer to:

Film and television
 Hush (1921 film), starring Clara Kimball Young
Hush (1998 film), starring Gwyneth Paltrow
Hush! (film), a 2001 Japanese film directed by Ryosuke Hashiguchi
Hush (2005 film), starring Tori Spelling
Hush (2008 film), a British horror/thriller film
Hush, also known as Ja saapuu oikea yö, a 2012 Finnish film
Hush (2013 film), a Croatian film
Hush (2016 film), an American horror/thriller film
Hush (2016 short film), an American/horror drama film
Batman: Hush (film), a 2019 animated adaptation of a DC Comics story (see below)
"Hush" (Buffy the Vampire Slayer), a 1999 episode of Buffy the Vampire Slayer
Hush (TV series), a South Korean television series
 Hush (American TV series), a 2022 drama series on ALLBLK

Literature
Hush (character), a DC Comics supervillain
Batman: Hush, a 2002–2003 story arc introducing the character
Hush (novel), a 2010 novel written under the pseudonym Eishes Chayil
Hush: An Irish Princess' Tale, a 2007 young adult novel by Donna Jo Napoli

Music
Hush!! Full Band Festival, a Chinese rock festival
Hush Records, an American record label

Performers 
Hush (band), an Australian glam rock group
Hush, a 1990s Serbian blues rock group featuring Ana Popović
Hush (aka The Sound of Hush), a Danish pop group formed in 1997
Hush (rapper) (born 1972), American rapper
Hush (singer) (born 1985), Taiwanese singer

Albums 
Hush! (Ana Popović album), 2001
Hush (Asobi Seksu album), 2009
Hush! (Duke Pearson album) or the title song, 1962
Hush (Jane Siberry album), 2000
Hush (The Limousines album) or the title song, 2013
Hush (Miss A album) or the title song, 2013
Hush (Yo-Yo Ma and Bobby McFerrin album), 1992
Hush (single album) or the title song, by Everglow, 2019
The Hush, 1999 album by Texas

Songs 
"Hush", by Jackie Edwards, 1965
"Hush" (Billy Joe Royal song), 1967; covered by Deep Purple (1968), Kula Shaker (1997), and others
"Hush" (Emily Osment and Josh Ramsay song), 2011
"Hush" (LL Cool J song), 2004
"Hush" (Tool song), 1992
"Hush", by Apink from Une Annee, 2012
"Hush", by Club 8 from Pleasure, 2015
"Hush", by Hellyeah from Blood for Blood, 2015
"Hush", by Koda Kumi from DNA, 2018

People
Noel Hush (1924–2019), Australian chemist
Ralph Hush (1783–1860), English convict sent to Australia
Ramon Abbas (born 1982), Nigerian criminal, commonly known as Hush

Villages
Hush, East Azerbaijan, a village in East Azerbaijan Province, Iran
Hush, Hamadan, a village in Hamadan Province, Iran
Hush, Lorestan, a village in Lorestan Province, Iran

Other uses
Operation Hush, a British First World War plan
Hush, A boss from The Binding of Issac: Rebirth

See also
Hushe, Pakistan, a village
Hushe Valley, Pakistan
Hushe River, Pakistan
Huish (disambiguation)